The sport of football in the country of Iraq is run by the Iraq Football Association. The association administers the national football team as well as the Iraqi Premier League. Football is the most popular sport in Iraq.

National teams

The national team have qualified for the final tournament of the World Cup once in 1986 which was held in Mexico. Success in the Asian Cup has been more widespread, winning the tournament in 2007 and finishing fourth in 1976 and 2015. As of 2015 the women's national team have not entered either of these competitions.

The under-23 side has had success at the Asian Games winning silver at the 2006 edition in Qatar and bronze in the 2014 tournament, held in South Korea. Their best placing in Olympic football has been fourth at Athens in 2004.

As of 11 June 2020 the men's team were ranked 70th in the world while the women's team were not ranked due to being inactive.

Football Stadiums in Iraq
The Ministry of Youth and Sports developed plans to drastically improve sports infrastructure and have decided to build big stadiums in every governorate of Iraq. The government gave them a $2.5bn package for this cause, and plans have been drawn up to build most of the stadiums below. They have also used some of this budget to improve football on a local level in areas of the country. Most stadiums listed below have been funded by this package, unless they are one of the older stadiums, or the proposed Baghdad Sports City, which will be funded by the Saudi king, King Salman.

Club tournaments
Aliyat Al-Shorta reached the final of the AFC Champions League, the biggest tournament in Asian football, in 1971 but withdrew from the final due to it being against an Israeli team. Al-Rasheed also reached the final in 1989 but lost on away goals. Al-Shorta won the first ever edition of the Arab Club Champions Cup in 1982 with Al-Rasheed winning that competition three times in a row (1985, 1986, 1987). Al-Talaba and Al-Zawraa both lost the final of the Asian Cup Winners' Cup in 1995 and 2000 respectively, before Al-Quwa Al-Jawiya won Asia's second-tier tournament, the AFC Cup, three consecutive times in 2016, 2017 and 2018.

Domestic league titles won by club

See also

 Women's football in Iraq
 Iraq Football Association (IFA)
 Iraq national football team
 Iraqi football league system
 Iraqi Premier League
 List of Iraqi football champions

References

External links
 Iraq Football Association